Vandenbrink Design is a Netherlands-based automotive design and coachbuilding company, founded in 2006 by Michiel van den Brink and Robert Koumans.

Cars 
In 2006, Van den Brink introduced a plan to design and build a special coachbuilt Ferrari, which received positive reception.

Currently the company is working on the "Vandenbrink GTO", a tribute to the 1962 Ferrari 250 GTO, based on the underpinnings of the Ferrari 599 GTB Fiorano. Coachbuilding will be performed by Italian partners.

In July 2009, Vandenbrink announced development of the Fra Mauro, a carbon fiber-bodied coach apparently based on the Spyker C8 Spyder chassis and featuring a mid-engine 4.2 litre V8 layout. Production numbers have yet to be determined.

In April 2010, Van den Brink left the company to become an independent designer, leaving the firm to his business partner Robert Koumans.

References

Automotive companies of the Netherlands
Privately held companies of the Netherlands
Manufacturing companies based in Amsterdam